The Meron Junction Bus 361 attack was a suicide bombing which occurred on August 4, 2002 on an Egged bus in the Meron junction in northern Israel near Safed. 9 people were killed in the attack and 38 people were injured.

The Palestinian Islamist militant organization Hamas claimed responsibility for the attack.

Attack
On 7:15 am of Thursday, 4 August 2002, Egged bus No. 361 left Haifa towards Safed and was full of soldiers on their way to military bases in north Israel. The suicide bomber boarded the bus near Karmiel.

At around 8:45 am, when the bus stopped at the Meron junction bus station, the suicide bomber, who was at the back of the bus, detonated the explosive device hidden underneath his clothes. The blast, which occurred while about 50 passengers were on the bus, caused heavy damage.

Six civilians, two of them from the Philippines, and three soldiers were killed in the explosion and 38 other passengers were injured, nine of them critically.

External links 
 August 4, 2002: 13 dead in a day of terror - published at the Israeli Ministry of Foreign Affairs
 Israel bus attack causes carnage - published on BBC News on 4 August 2002
 Israel's week of bloodshed: bus bomb kills 9 as 4 other innocents are shot to death - published on the New York Post on August 5, 2002

References

Mass murder in 2002
Hamas suicide bombings of buses
Terrorist incidents in Israel in 2002
August 2002 events in Asia
Islamic terrorism in Israel
Suicide bombings in 2002
August 2002 crimes
20th-century mass murder in Israel
2002 murders in Israel